Apionichthys is a genus of mostly freshwater American soles native to South America.

Species
The currently recognized species in this genus are:
 Apionichthys dumerili Kaup, 1858 (longtail sole)
 Apionichthys finis (C. H. Eigenmann, 1912)
 Apionichthys menezesi R. T. C. Ramos, 2003
 Apionichthys nattereri (Steindachner, 1876)
 Apionichthys rosai R. T. C. Ramos, 2003
 Apionichthys sauli R. T. C. Ramos, 2003
 Apionichthys seripierriae R. T. C. Ramos, 2003

References

Achiridae
Ray-finned fish genera
Taxa named by Johann Jakob Kaup